Til Death Do Us Part (also known in Canada and Australia as Love You To Death) is a legal drama television series that debuted on Court TV on March 19, 2007.

Til Death Do Us Part goes by the motto "To Love, Honor, and Perish".

Format 
The series was narrated and hosted by cult film director John Waters, who played "The Groom Reaper."  The scripted program re-enacted real-life courtroom stories involving marriages and families whose seemingly picture-perfect lives end in a murderous way. The series had a Tales from the Crypt-like setting, with each episode lasting 30 minutes. At each end of an episode, John Waters would say "I have another wedding to go to, but I hope it won't be yours".

After 15 minutes of the show, Court TV would allow viewers to text message a guess on who would be the killer. Each re-enactment is directed to be intentionally over-the-top, complete with overacting and cringe-worthy dialogue.

Court TV's commercials promoting the show parody the DeBeers diamond television ads, through the use of silhouettes and dramatic background music.

Plot 
The show is about how two people get married and how one spouse ends up involved in the murder of the other spouse. The viewers were able to guess who murdered whom. The murderer was announced at the end of each show.

Cast

Episodes

Production 
Til Death Do Us Part is filmed in Canada as a co-production between Court TV and Canada's Global Television Network.  The show debuted in Canada on Global on March 21, 2007, under the title Love You To Death.

External links 
 

2007 American television series debuts
2007 American television series endings
2000s American reality television series
2007 Canadian television series debuts
2007 Canadian television series endings
2000s Canadian reality television series
TruTV original programming
English-language television shows